Wayunkayuq (Quechua wayunka a bunch of bananas, -yuq a suffix to indicate ownership, "the one with a bunch of bananas", also spelled Huayuncayoc) is a mountain in the Andes of Peru which reaches a height of approximately . It is located in the Junín Region, Tarma Province, Acobamba District, south of Acobamba.

References 

Mountains of Peru
Mountains of Junín Region